There have been two separate generations of trams in Rouen. The first generation tramway was a tram network built in Rouen, Normandy, northern France, that started service in 1877, and finally closed in 1953. There were no trams at all in Rouen between 1953 and 1994, when the modern Rouen tramway opened.

Horse-drawn carriages and omnibuses had started at the end of the 18th century and progressively improved, but were no longer enough to provide urban services in an age of industrial and demographic growth. Local officials therefore adopted the tramway as a new  mode of transport. At first they were horse-drawn, and later steam-powered; the tramway was electrified in 1896.

The network spread quickly through various city-centre districts on the right bank of the Seine, to reach the suburbs of the northern plateau, the hills of Bonsecours in the east, skirting around the textile valley of the River Cailly in the west, crossing the river and serving, in the south, the suburbs and industrial districts of the left bank.

At its largest it covered  of route, the longest network in France during the Belle Époque, and contributed to the success of events in the town's history, such as the Colonial Exhibition of 1896 and the Norman Millennium Festival of 1911.

Although the 1920s saw a slight growth in traffic, the network's expansion slowed to a halt. Private motoring had arrived to put an end to its monopoly. The rising power of buses and trolleybuses, the Great Depression in France, and above all the Second World War that ravaged Rouen and Normandy, condemned the tramway to death. The last trams stopped running in 1953, after seventy-six years of service. However, in 1994, a new Rouen tramway came to the Norman capital.

The first tramways

Horse and steam

Rouen was integrated into the French Kingdom after Philip II of France annexed Normandy in 1204, and it continued as one of the largest cities in the kingdom under the Ancien Régime. It prospered during the 19th century, with the traditional trades of textiles and Rouen manufactory (faïence) alongside the newer chemical and papermaking industries. The navigable Seine, emptying at Rouen, had been Parisians' route to the sea ever since the Middle Ages. Napoleon Bonaparte said "" ("Rouen and Le Havre form a single town of which the Seine is the High Street"). Rouen and Orléans were the first large cities to be connected by rail to Paris, on 3 May 1843. After the Franco-Prussian War of 1870 – 1871, the economy of the First Industrial Revolution under the Second Empire, and the ever-growing population, obliged the Rouen city authorities to rethink the travel facilities both within the city centre and between it and the expanding suburbs.

Urban services — always horse-drawn, either carriages or omnibuses on the most profitable routes — were not enough to satisfy the needs of a town that already numbered, with its suburbs, more than  people. From 1873 to 1875 the city fathers commissioned a study into building railways connecting the most populous areas of Rouen. A decree was signed on 5 May 1876, committing to a publicly owned standard gauge network, and to horse-drawn carriages. Nine lines stretching , or 1,370 chains were decreed:

The town was authorised to tender construction and operation to one or more contractors. It quickly chose the only serious candidate, Gustav Palmer Harding, a British citizen. He was the continental representative of Merryweather & Sons, builders of steam tram engines. This decision knitted the close railway links between the city and Great Britain that remained for nearly half a century. Naturally, Mr Harding wanted to promote his company's machines, so he long made his views known to the municipal authorities. Finally convinced, they authorised him to use steam power from Maromme (Line 1), entering service on 29 December 1877. Merryweather & Sons, whose depot was on the Avenue du Mont-Riboudet, provided the tram units. Small and light —  — these reversible locomotives had two coupled axles, fully covered by a wooden body. They looked the same as a normal carriage so as not to frighten the horses. These steam carriages had enclosed lower decks; the upper decks were roofed but had open sides.

The first steam trams of Léon Francq's design soon appeared on the Maromme line and coexisted with the horse-drawn tramways that served the city centre.

Success and doubts

The successful first line was soon extended to the Place Saint-Hilaire, opening on 1 June 1878. He also started steam traction from Darnétal (Line 2; started 23 June 1879). On the other hand, the lines that went through narrow local streets remained horse-drawn when first opened: Line 4 (opened 3 October 1878), Line 5, (opening 12 December 1878), Line 6 (opened 6 February 1879), and Line 3 (opened 27 September 1879). Line 9 was not constructed because of technical difficulties.

For more than six years, twenty-three locomotives coexisted with horse-drawn trams on the Rouen network. The frequent stops let the boilers cool down, so coal consumption was high. Moreover, steam power angered both residents — who accused them of being dirty and rough-riding — and coachmen — whose animals were scared by the driver's horn and the "infernal" noise of the trains. Operation thus was totally horse-drawn from 1884. The CTR thus found itself in charge of a "cavalry" of around 350 horses, stabled at Trianon and Maromme, the depot at Mont-Riboudet having been disposed of.

Electrification

In 1895 the mediocrity of horse-drawn service and the prospect of the great Colonial Exposition (due to open in Rouen on 1 April 1896) made the town officials think of extension and electrification of the network. Councillors were sent on study trips both in France and abroad. One councillor even spent a year in the United States. At last, after much debate, the town accepted the CTR's proposals. Electrification was contracted to the company of Thomson Houston, who built the "first network", ten lines of standard gauge, either over new or re-laid tracks:

Longest electric tramway in France

Second network

Infrastructure works and construction of the power station on the Rue Lemire were swiftly completed. The first electric locomotive entered service on 2 January 1896, the electrified network going live fifteen days ahead of schedule; the last horse-drawn tram saw service on 19 July on the Sotteville line. After teething troubles, the new mode of transport had considerable success: in 1896 it transported over fifteen million passengers. The tram sheds, holding 50 vehicles, were expanded to accommodate 25 more during the first year of service. These were classic tramcars with two axles, powered by two  motors (one on each axle), and had room for 40 passengers. With its popular success, the network could be completed: the Line 10 extension to Saint-Étienne-du-Rouvray was opened on 16 April 1899, an 11th line was constructed from Maromme to Notre-Dame-de-Bondeville (opened 17 December 1899), and a 12th from the Church of Saint-Sever to the Saint-Maur sea wall (6 February 1908). The Rouen tramways had  of lines, the largest electric network in France.

The dynamism of public transport in Rouen was an inspiration to Baron Empain who, through the intermediary of his colleague Cauderay, proposed the creation of a second complementary network. He met numerous difficulties to which the CTR was no stranger, but on 17 July 1899, a new company to be called  (a sister company of the better-known  — CGT —) was granted the concession over five routes:

The first services started on Line 1 on 18 January 1900, the other services starting on 10 May that year, but, facing competition from the CTR, the tramway from Petit-Quevilly was curtailed, its terminus becoming Rue Léon-Malétra.

Towards monopoly

(In 1908, over 20 million people used public transport in Rouen, 19 million with the CTR, 1.6 million with the CGT.) In 1908 the CGT disposed of the second network to the  because of administrative problems, a serious accident at Monumental on 6 November 1908 and a considerable deficit. This became an opportunity for the rival CRT, who in 1910 took over the CGT's running rights and so were finally rid of competition.

The CTR was now master of all of the public transport in Rouen and its suburbs (having also absorbed the tramway and funicular railway of Bonsecours on 25 September 1909). It reorganised its service to be more integrated. It also expanded the service with later-running trams, and extended Line 12 first to Champ de Courses (opened 1 January 1910) then to Bois-Guillaume (opened 4 June 1911) and Mont-Saint-Aignan (opened 15 March 1913). This last section, running over the local authority's rails, connected Grand-Quevilly (Rue de l’Église) and, on a branch, the district of Petit-Quevilly (opened 1 August 1915).

World War I

World War I did not affect tram service in Rouen as much as it did elsewhere. After a short period of disruption during the great August 1914 mobilisation, the CTR maintained normal service during the four years of war. It overcame its reduced staffing levels with overtime, abolition of leave, and redeployment of depot personnel; nearly all conductors were promoted to motormen, to their great satisfaction. At the end of 1916, women (aged 24 or over in 1916, reduced to 23 or over in 1918) joined men on the trams, but, sexism at that time being the norm, the "wattwomen" (female motormen) were only allowed on the "easy" lines of Mont-Saint-Aignan, Bois-Guillaume and Monumental, and were not allowed on steep gradients.

To satisfy military requirements, the network extended the Champ de Courses track to the Château du Madrillet, headquarters of an important BEF base. It also built a connection to transport the injured arriving by train at the Gare Saint-Sever to the main hospitals of Rouen. These installations, constructed in record time, disappeared when the war ended.

Operational difficulties and closure

Recovery and competition
During World War I the track and rolling stock received little maintenance, and by the end of the war they were in a piteous state, while expenses had increased dramatically. The problem became a crisis after the serious fire at the Trianon depot on 30 November 1921, which destroyed 70 of the 155 trams of the CTR. Successive fare rises provided a stopgap, but with the new convention of 29 December 1923 the company announced a reorganisation of the network. A competitor had also arrived: the bus. Trams had always attracted criticism over their limited capacity, slowness and discomfort, and their encumbrance to motor cars in the city centre. Another accident on the Monumental line on 5 October 1925 hastened the inevitable: the trams lost their first route.

Fightback through innovation

Against these setbacks, the CTR still had a record year in 1928, with over 30 million journeys. But from 1929, the buses took to the narrow streets in the city centre, as well as routes with low tram traffic such as Chartreux, Maromme and the circular. The tramways continued as going concerns, and started large programmes of renovation and modernisation in the dozen or so years before World War II. Between 1928 and 1932, 75 first-generation trams were rebuilt to allow one man operation.

The Rouen workshops presently devised two prototypes, of classical design, but with double folding doors at the front and safety devices (compressed air on one of the prototypes, electrical on the other) which became the basis for a series of 25 vehicles named "Nogentaises". 25 new trailing cars completed the new rolling stock. In 1931, a "revolutionary" pedal-controlled locomotive was built equipped with disc brakes, but lack of funds meant no more came of it.

The 1930s also saw the arrival of the trolleybus, having the twin advantages of electrical traction and pneumatic tyres; these newcomers supplanted the old trams on the Mont-Saint-Aignan line from Sotteville and Saint-Étienne-du-Rouvray. In 1938, the tram sheds were enlarged for the arrival of the "Parisiennes", ten reversible trams bought from Paris.

World War II and after

World War II hit Rouen hard, including its transport network. In 1939, before the war started, mobilisation and requisition had reduced the service frequency; the German advance, in 1940, blew up the city's bridges; on 9 June 1940 the Rouen Transporter Bridge was destroyed, which split the tram network in two until 1946. With the German occupation, the lines were progressively reopened. But service was reduced. Difficulties became such during this period that the directors of the CTR had to improvise mobile  workshops. The heavy bombing raids of Spring 1944, in particular the destruction of the central part of the Rue Lemire, stopped the trams running.

Nazi occupation ended on 30 August 1944 and Liberation slowly healed the town's wounds. It had been a catastrophe for the network: of the 76 trams in circulation in 1939, 24 had been destroyed and 25 damaged; track and overhead lines had been mutilated; the Trianon depot had been bombed several times Still, service was slowly restored, thanks to the staff's hard work and above all passengers' help in shunting trailing cars. In 1945, 38 locomotives and 14 trailing cars were operational, but, despite restoration of service across the Seine on 20 April 1946, the war had struck a fatal blow. Rouen was full of out-of-date equipment and so trams were progressively replaced by buses and trolleybuses.

In March 1950 the municipality decided definitely to close the tramway, but its actual closure came somewhat later. It was not until Saturday, 28 February 1953 that the last tram ran on the Champ de Courses line, 76 years after the network's first service. But the Rouennaise did not forget the tram's services rendered, organising a first-class funeral: Just before the last scheduled run, a parade of honour made up of three trams ran from the Hôtel de ville to the Trianon depot, cheered by the crowds.

Bonsecours funicular railway and tramway

Bonsecours is a commune on a plateau to the southwest of Rouen. Until 1890 only an infrequent bus service linked it to Rouen. However, it attracted many hikers, with its splendid panoramas over the meandering Seine, and pilgrims visiting the shrine to the Virgin Mary.

Early projects
A first railway project for the mountain, later known by the name , was presented in 1876 by Cordier; it was one of the far-flung ideas that the railway companies often had in the 19th century. Because classical rail has poor adherence, Cordier designed a raceway made of two granite rails embedded in concrete with a continuous guide rail between them. The  line, with a terminus at the Quai de la Bourse, would be served by steam carriages with a capacity of only 30 places, but capable of running on public streets as well as its special track.  Because of its technical complexity the line would have been hugely expensive, the 1:1 gradient to Bonsecours requiring no fewer than 30 viaducts spanning overall . The project was soon abandoned.

Construction
In 1892 Bonsecours was finally connected to the "world below" when two Swiss engineers, Ludwig and Schopfer, built a funicular railway with water-filled counterweights. On 8 June 1892 it was formally declared open to the public and first ran eleven days later on 19 June. Each car could hold 90 people (50 seated), and its water tank could be filled in five minutes. There were twelve journeys each way daily, more on busier days. But the ferry service from its terminus at Eauplet to Rouen was irregular, and by the end of the century it had a dangerous rival: the tramway.

At first, in 1899, the tramway was designed to be steam powered, but by 1895 this had changed to electromotive power. The trams had greater power than their Rouen counterparts, with  motors. They could climb steep gradients (up to 9:100) and could accommodate 48 passengers, with 42 more in a trailing car.

New ownership and closure
  
The figures were so catastrophic that on 25 November 1905 the CTB sacked the management of the railway, and liquidated the defunct . Operations continued, and the CTR took over both tracks on 25 December 1909. Although the tramway was always well used ( tickets sold in 1913), the clientele of the funicular continued to fall ( tickets collected the same year), and some daily receipts were less than 1 franc. Lacking passengers, the funicular closed on 25 May 1915, and the tramway became the monopoly service for Bonsecours. This date should not be confused with that for the Rouen service, which continued until February 1953.

Trianon tramway

Left bank
At the start of the 20th century the suburbs of the left bank were the quickest growing areas of Rouen, in particular the communes of Sotteville (a large railway town) and Grand-Quevilly, but these towns did not have good enough public transport. Although the CTR had constructed some lines, they did not well serve residents wishing for rapid transit between the suburbs and the city centre. Line 4 of the CTR, with its central terminus at Place Beauvoisine, ran only as far as the Trianon roundabout at the edge of the Jardin des Plantes. A southern extension was planned to the Bruyères roundabout, a meeting-point of several roads to the new districts, and to the racecourse where major horse racing events took place each Thursday. But it was always delayed.

In 1903 a Sotteville man, M. Hulin, the owner and proprietor of the Château des
Two years passed in discussing the project's profitability (profit for both Hulin and M. Dagan, the engineer from the Corps of Bridges and Roads) and for tendering the construction of the line to a contractor other than the CTR. This time for reflection led to abandoning horse-drawn trams in favour of mechanical traction, and moving the terminus from the racecourse entrance to the vast cemetery that the authorities intended to build, close to a shooting range. The CTR did not oppose the line, which would not compete with their own, so it was made a Public Local Railway on 10 March 1905.

Small train in town

The line was put into service on 1 April 1906, well before the official opening date of 28 April. This short  route, opened solely for passenger traffic, traced a rectangle between the Trianon roundabout and the racecourse, the  narrow gauge rails being established beside the Rue d’Elbeuf between the trees lining the road and the fences separating adjacent land (much of which was owned by Hulin). Service was provided by two  diesel-electric locomotives, built by the Turgan workshops, each with room for 16 people, and the fuel depot was  sited near to the racecourse. The service was particularly frequent: thirty journeys each way per day.

The first months' service did not meet Hulin's expectations; passenger numbers were much lower than expected, the coefficient of use was catastrophic: 0.39. In 1906 a law was passed instituting a weekly day of rest, so it was decided, from 12 January 1907, to extend the line  to the Madrillet roundabout at the edge of the Rouvray Forest, which was popular for Sunday walks. This  double-track extension was inaugurated on 27 August 1907. The same year, diesel-electric locomotives (whose "terrible noise" frightened the horses, to the chagrin of their owners) were replaced by electromotive traction. Two Orenstein & Koppel 0-4-0T steam locomotives headed two open carriages each taking 16 passengers. Their chimneys were fitted with spark arresters to prevent forest fires around Rouvray.

Brief life

Except on Thursdays, horse racing day, and Sundays where the tramway took amorous walkers to the forest paths, the trams went with few passengers, often with none. What is more, the high number of return journeys reduced the possibility of making connections in Rouen: passengers on the small line may have had to wait a long time at the Trianon roundabout for a connection to the city centre. The situation so preoccupied the  that in January 1908 it replaced Hulin, always the driving force, and asked the Conseil Général to authorise a reduction in service frequency. But it also proposed to use four-car trams instead of two-car trams on busy days. Although the departmental authorities accepted the extra cars, they would only allow the reduction of service with much red tape, as can be seen from this extract from the report of Soulier, the Conseiller général of Rouen:

It is well understood that, at the moment it is only a minimum, the Society is always free to put in place the number of trains necessary to transport passengers who present themselves, that if it will satisfy this requirement, its proper interest is guaranteed, and, in giving greater public satisfaction, its infrastructure will be wisely used, instead of it travelling empty for part of the day to the detriment of its business. Being given the lower frequency of service on weekdays and Saturdays, except Thursdays (racing), we can perfectly accept the reduction to ten trips to those going from the racecourse to the forest, but, concerning the part of the journey from Trianon to the racecourse, it is imperative that the Chief Engineer (Lechelas) keeps the minimum to 30, otherwise there will be a kind of abandonment of the line, because for this small distance, it will not be possible to get reasonable traffic with more frequent departures.

The service modifications lowered operating expenses, but the coefficient of use went down dramatically: 0.33 for the first ten months of 1908. The decision to axe the line was made on 1 November 1908. Two strategic errors had been made: wanting a service independent of the CTR's network, and putting its terminus out of town. The railway was officially disbanded by a decree of 14 September 1911, the rails were lifted, the public highway restored; no trace of the tramway remains.

Modern tramway

In 1953 one of the largest electric tramways in France disappeared. But in the 1980s Rouen — and other large cities such as Nantes and Grenoble — decided that increasing traffic jams and the desire to diversify public transport needed a new mode of public transport. Discussions started in 1982 under the guidance of SIVOM ("Intercommune syndicate of several trades"), grouping together the communes of Greater Rouen (representing nearly  inhabitants).

In 1986, CETE ("Technical and construction study centre") put forward a report supporting construction of a modern tramway. A pre-project was launched in September 1987 and led to the Declaration of Public Utility on 22 April 1991. Construction work was undertaken by GEC-Alsthom and on 17 December 1994 the first line of the modern Rouen tramway was inaugurated.

See also
 Rouen tramway

Notes

References

Sources

Further reading

External links

 History of the TCAR 
Webstite of the  

Transport in Rouen
Rapid transit lines
Defunct railroads
Tram transport in France
History of Rouen
1877 establishments in France
1953 disestablishments in France
600 mm gauge railways in France
Rouen